Gurneyville (also Guerneyville) is an unincorporated community, in Clinton County, Ohio, United States.

History
Gurneyville was platted in 1847, and named for Joseph John Gurney, a prominent local Quaker. A post office called Gurneyville was established in 1875, and remained in operation until 1905.

Notable person
Francis A. Wallar, Medal of Honor recipient

Notes

Unincorporated communities in Clinton County, Ohio
Unincorporated communities in Ohio